The Hamilton Grange Branch of the New York Public Library is a historic library building located in Hamilton Heights, Manhattan, New York City. It was designed by McKim, Mead & White and built in 1905–1906. The branch was one of 65 built by the New York Public Library with funds provided by the philanthropist Andrew Carnegie, 11 of them designed by McKim, Mead & White. It is a three-story-high, five-bay-wide building faced in deeply rusticated gray limestone in an Italian Renaissance style.  The building features round arched openings on the first floor and bronze lamps and grilles.

It was designated a New York City Landmark in 1970 and was listed on the National Register of Historic Places in 1981.

See also
 List of New York City Designated Landmarks in Manhattan above 110th Street
 National Register of Historic Places listings in Manhattan above 110th Street

References

Library buildings completed in 1906
Libraries on the National Register of Historic Places in Manhattan
Renaissance Revival architecture in New York City
Carnegie libraries in New York City
Hamilton Grange Branch
Washington Heights, Manhattan
1906 establishments in New York City
New York City Designated Landmarks in Manhattan